Mojo is a supervillain appearing in American comic books published by Marvel Comics, usually those featuring the X-Men family of characters. Created by writer Ann Nocenti and artist Arthur Adams, Mojo first appeared in Longshot #3 (Nov. 1985), as the titular hero's archenemy, and subsequently a villain to the X-Men and their various sub-groups as well.

Mojo is one of the "Spineless Ones", an alien race that is immobile without advanced technology. He is a slaver who rules the Mojoverse, a dimension where all beings are addicted to his gladiator-like television programs. The character is an absurdist parody of network executives, and was inspired by Nocenti's reading of media critics Marshall McLuhan, Noam Chomsky, and Walter Lippmann.

Publication history
At the time she wrote the Longshot miniseries, writer Ann Nocenti was pursuing her Master's degree at the School of International and Public Affairs, Columbia University, working at the magazine Lies of Our Times, and reading the work of writers like Marshall McLuhan, Noam Chomsky, Edward S. Herman and Walter Lippmann. Mojo, a slaver and dictator who rules his dimension through the television programs he produces, was created as a direct result of these influences. (A character named Manufactured Consent, after the Chomsky book of the same name, who appeared in Nocenti's 1990 The New Mutants Summer Special, was also born of these works.) Artist Art Adams designed the character per Nocenti's instructions that he be disgusting and unpleasant, and also tried to make him look frightening. The wires that hold Mojo's eyelids open, thus preventing him from blinking, were inspired by an interview with actor Malcolm McDowell on Late Night with David Letterman, in which McDowell revealed that the similar apparatus he had to wear for the Ludovico technique scene in A Clockwork Orange had scarred his corneas. The rest of the equipment attached to Mojo's head controls his mechanized chair.

Mojo first appeared in Longshot #3 (Nov. 1985), and was the main villain of the miniseries, appearing in the subsequent three issues.

The character subsequently appeared in The New Mutants Annual #2 (1986). That same year, in The Uncanny X-Men Annual #10, Mojo appeared as the villain in the story, which saw Longshot join the X-Men. In 1988, Mojo appeared in a backup story in The Uncanny X-Men Annual #12. He was the main villain of the one-shot special Excalibur: Mojo Mayhem (Dec. 1989). Subsequent appearances include Marvel Comics Presents #89 (1991), The Uncanny X-Men Annual #15 (1991), Wolverine vol. 2 #52 (March 1992), X-Men #6 (March 1992), Wolverine vol. 2 #53 (April 1992), X-Men #7 (April 1992), #10-11 (July–Aug. 1992), The Uncanny X-Men Annual 16 (1992), Marvel Comics Presents #119 (1993), What If? vol. 2 #59 (March 1994), X-Men Adventures: Season Two #11 (Dec. 1994), Marvel: Portraits of the Universe #1 (March 1995), X-Men: Mutations #1 (1996), Youngblood/X-Force #1 (July 1996), X-Force/Youngblood #1 (Aug. 1996), X-Force #60-61 (Nov.–Dec. 1996), The Adventures of the X-Men #9-10 (1996-Jan. 1997), X-Babies: Murderama #1 (Jan. 1998), X-Force #76 (April 1998), X-Babies Reborn #1 (Jan. 2000), X-Men Unlimited #32 (Sept. 2001), Exiles #18-19 (Dec. 2002-Jan. 2003), The Uncanny X-Men #460-461 (Aug. 2005), and Exiles #73-74 (Feb. 2006).

Mojo was featured in an entry in The Official Handbook of the Marvel Universe Deluxe Edition #8, and in the All-New Official Handbook of the Marvel Universe A-Z #7 (2006).

Fictional character biography
Most of the denizens of what would come to be called the Mojoverse were slowly driven insane by waves of energy from another space-time continuum. It would take centuries (of their time) for them to discover the origin of these transmissions. Mojo's race did not evolve much because of their inability to stand upright, until a scientist named Arize developed exoskeletons that allowed a fast technological revolution. Some members of the race refused to use them and called themselves the Spineless Ones. Instead, they used motorized platforms to transport their bodies. They also became the rulers and demanded a race of slaves to do all the tasks they could not or would not do. Arize created the slaves, humanoid beings, using genetic engineering and basing their appearance on the "demons" of the Spineless Ones' nightmares - which were actually the characters of TV broadcasts of Earth-616, somehow scattered throughout their time line and perceived by the Spineless Ones. Unknown to the Spineless Ones, Arize secretly planted the seeds in their genetic make-up to eventually turn on their masters and rule Mojoworld justly. Arize was banished by the Spineless Ones when he refused to build weapons for them.

The power structure of this world was based on the television industry and Mojo became their leader by controlling it, along with the slave trade. Mojo named the world after himself; 'Mojo World' and the dimension the 'Mojoverse'. His followers, including Warwolves (vaguely dog-like metallic beings with the ability to kill people and take over the remains of their bodies as skins), became known as Wildways. Mojo also has a Chamberlain, an android named Major Domo, who oversees Mojo's financial records and relays Mojo's commands to his servants. Major Domo is completely loyal to Mojo, but often obeys with sarcastic comments towards Mojo. Major Domo's assistant, a near-constant companion, is called Minor Domo, a hysterical young girl prone to imagining worst-case scenarios.

One of the slaves Mojo had ordered, Longshot, became one of his best stunt performers. However, Longshot disagreed with the rules and led a rebellion (most likely motivated by the death of Jackson, a fellow stuntman). He was captured and had his memories removed, but managed to escape to Earth, followed by bounty hunters. On Earth Longshot found allies in the form of Dr. Strange and the human stuntwoman Rita Ricochet and they managed to defeat Mojo, driving him back to his own world. Longshot, his friend Quark and Rita returned to the Mojoverse to free their fellow slaves. Longshot's mission failed and they were captured by Mojo. Longshot was brainwashed again, while Rita was tied to the bow of Mojo's worldtravelling ship, serving as a guide. In an alternate future, Mojo had Rita transformed into an insane warrior/mage named Spiral and she was sent back in time to capture or kill Longshot.

Mojo became interested in Earth and captured and brainwashed the blinded Betsy Braddock, renaming her "The Psylocke." Much later it was learned that the eyes bionic eyes Mojo gave her were in fact interdimensional cameras allowing Mojo to record and broadcast all she could see. Psylocke was rescued by the New Mutants, and she aided both the New Mutants and the X-Men before officially becoming an X-Man herself. It was later revealed that Betsy's body retained robotic eyes, as her consciousness was switched with the one of a comatose Japanese assassin.

Shortly afterward, Mojo sent Longshot to Earth where he joined the X-Men as well. Mojo had planned on enslaving the X-Men by turning them into children, but the New Mutants managed to free them and together they forced Mojo to flee again. Still Mojo found out that the adventures of the X-Men shot the audience level to top ratings; which increased his political power.

Mojo also manipulated the X-Men member Rachel Summers into working for him, but she soon escaped after realizing she was little more than a prisoner. Further setbacks began as Psylocke's broadcasts stopped when the X-Men were presumedly killed by the Adversary, but Mojo wanted to have footage of the X-Men to improve his ratings,  so one of his assistants came up with a possible solution; create versions that could be controlled. Many different versions of the X-Men appeared before him, but he considered them all failures and ordered their death except the X-Babies. The X-babies were an immediate success but they rebelled almost immediately and escaped taking Rita with them.

Mojo reappeared along with an alternate version of Jubilee. Mojo had kidnapped Jubilee, taking her to the "Big Crunch", the end of time where all matter would collapse. Jubilee agreed to be Mojo's slave if he wouldn't interrupt the Crunch. Older and renamed Abcissa, she kidnapped her younger self and took her to the Crunch. Wolverine appeared with a missile and defeated Mojo. Since Jubilee refused Mojo's offer, Abcissa's existence was nullified.

Eventually, Longshot returned to free the slaves and deposed Mojo, with the help of Mojo's upright, more human looking (although yellow) clone Mojo II: The Sequel. However, Mojo II turned out to be just as bad as his predecessor and Longshot had to defeat him as well. After Mojo II was ousted, Mojo reclaimed his position and became the leader of Mojo World once more.

Mojo never learned from his mistake concerning the X-babies and would create more X-Babies, who also rebelled. Eventually all of the X-Men had X-Baby counterparts on Mojoworld, and they all rebelled against Mojo and fled to an area he could not reach. He also created the Mitey 'Vengers (child versions of the Avengers) to finally stop the X-Babies once and for all. Of course, the Mitey 'Vengers, being essentially of the same moral fabric as their adult counterparts, turned on Mojo and defeated him. Finally, he created toddler versions of the Age of Apocalypse villains. These entities were seemingly more intelligent and broke the control Mojo had on them. According to Dazzler these versions were responsible for the destruction of a great part of Mojoworld, but apparently Mojo managed to defeat them and managed to once again take control of Mojoworld. He then made a deal with the Exiles: in return for Longshot's help, Mojo receives broadcasts from all over the multiverse through the Exiles' crystal palace; prior to this, Mojo had tried to get his hands on Nocturne using the "Exile Legal Eagles", clones of the Exiles' previous lineup.

Later, Mojo reappeared along with the previously vanished Nocturne and Juggernaut, using a "Jean-Bomb" to turn the X-Men into babies, and after his defeat, a guilt-ridden Juggernaut was tempted with the offer of remaining a child, but ultimately refused. Emma Frost made sure that Mojo would be handled by professionals so that he would never bother the X-Men again and was locked away by the Government. But, he is now free once again.

During the "Endangered Species" storyline, Mojo was one of the villains Beast offered to sell his soul to in order to help in reversing the effects of M-Day. Spiral later mentions to Beast that Mojo is displeased with the fact that mutants are now an endangered species and how it will affect his television ratings.

In both 2010 and 2011 Mojo was revealed as the villain responsible for Spider-Man and Wolverine being sent randomly shifting through time, the time-shifts being virtual creations generated by Mojo as a new idea.

Later, Mojo was demoted by the producers on Mojo World due to low ratings and was moved to "Educational Broadcasting". He created an agency named The Yellow Eye and spied on every single mutant alive. When Cable sent Domino to spy on this agency, she ended up being captured and brainwashed by Mojo. His organization was eventually brought down by the X-Force, when Domino broke free from his control, and he was revealed as the mastermind behind the agency. Mojo is currently a prisoner of Cable's X-Force team.

In the 2016 Howard the Duck run, Mojo was revealed to have used footage of Howard's adventure to create a reality show for the Mojoverse. To fill in the gaps on Howard's life, Mojo filmed footage of a small alien in a duck costume interacting with Lea Thompson performing as Beverly Switzler (referencing the 1986 film adaptation of the character).

Powers and abilities
Mojo's multi-legged flying platform is armed with various particle beam weapons. It also has a large artificial appendage that can be used as an arm or a slicing weapon and two smaller arms. He is strong enough to hold a human off of the ground with one arm easily. He has several powers derived from magic, like the projection of magical energy blasts, controlling the minds of others, and inter-dimensional teleportation. These magical powers are strengthened by the 'worship of his followers' and hence directly linked to the popularity of his TV programs. He cannot be harmed by the touch of Rogue, no matter how long she is in contact with him. He has bear-hugged Rogue with much ease until she was left unconscious.

He is also a master manipulator and schemer, shown in his organization of his slaughter entertainment games. He can also call upon vast manpower to assist him in his endeavors and has access to vast technological resources.

Mojo is also a force of death and corruption, able to generate an anti-life field that makes his touch able to wither plants and age humans outside of his home dimension. According to Doctor Strange, his prolonged presence on Earth could cause storms and other natural disasters.

Other versions

Mojo claims that he and the beings who populate Mojo World are "unique" in the sense that unlike the rest of the Marvel Universe, Mojo World has no parallel counterpart; this was documented in Exiles #18-19. However, alternate versions of Longshot and Mojo exist in the Ultimate Marvel continuity, and an alternate future reality of Mojo World, where the Spineless Ones were mistreated slaves, was featured in the "Shattershot" storyline.

Ultimate Marvel
In the series Ultimate X-Men, which is a separate Marvel continuity, Mojo is not an alien but an ordinary human being named Mojo Adams. He is a well-dressed, obese albino television producer and political power in the nation of Genosha. He trapped a young mutant fugitive Longshot on an island where humans hunt him as part of a popular reality show "Hunt for Justice". This Mojo also has a Major Domo, a young, fit, human man with a family of his own. Later on he was seen working with Augustus "Gus" Beezer and hired Deadpool and his Marauders to capture the X-Men and bring them back to Krakoa where they were to be executed on live television by the Reavers. He kept Professor X captive and forced him to watch the entire show a la Clockwork Orange. His plans however were foiled by the combined efforts of the X-Men and Spider-Man, who was also captured during his visit to the X-Mansion. It is unknown what happened to Mojo after this because Xavier seemed to have "taken care" of him during his escape.

In other media

Television

 Mojo appears in X-Men: The Animated Series, voiced by Peter Wildman. This version possesses a mechanical tail tipped with a laser cannon.
 Mojo appears in Wolverine and the X-Men, voiced by Charlie Adler.
 Mojo appears in the Avengers Assemble episode "Mojo World", voiced by Ralph Garman. This version is capable of assuming a holographic human disguise based on Ultimate Marvel's "Mojo Adams".

Video games
 Mojo appears as a boss in X-Men.
 Mojo appears as the final boss of X-Men: Mojo World.
 Mojo makes a cameo appearance in Viewtiful Joe's ending for Marvel vs. Capcom 3: Fate of Two Worlds and Ultimate Marvel vs. Capcom 3. This version is a producer for a police procedural that Joe is starring in.
 Mojo appears as a playable character in Marvel Contest of Champions.

Merchandise
 In 1994, Toy Biz produced a Mojo action figure for their wave of X-Men: X-Force toys. A smaller die-cast metal version of the mold was also available under the banner "Steel Mutants" packaged with a Longshot figure.
 In 2002, a Unique HeroClix figure of Mojo was released in the "Clobberin' Time" set.
 In 2006, a "Build-A-Figure" Mojo toy was produced by Toy Biz for Wave 14 of their Marvel Legends toyline.
 In 2014, Bowen Designs produced a 17.5" tall statue of Mojo, which was designed and sculpted by the Kucharek Brothers.

References

External links
 Mojo at Marvel.com
 

Characters created by Ann Nocenti
Comics characters introduced in 1985
Fictional characters with albinism
Marvel Comics cyborgs
Fictional mass media owners
Fictional slave owners
Fictional television personalities
Genoshans
Male characters in comics
Marvel Comics extraterrestrial supervillains
Marvel Comics characters who use magic
Marvel Comics characters with superhuman strength
Characters created by Art Adams